David Rubinger (29 June 1924 – 2 March 2017) was an Israeli photographer and photojournalist. His famous photo of three Israeli paratroopers after the recapture of the Western Wall  has become an iconic image of the Six-Day War. Shimon Peres called Rubinger "the photographer of the nation in the making".

Biography
David Rubinger, an only child, was born in Vienna, Austria. When he was in high school, Nazi Germany annexed Austria in the Anschluss and with the help of Youth Aliyah, he escaped to Mandatory Palestine via Italy and settled in a Jordan Valley kibbutz. His father had already fled to England, but his mother was murdered in the Holocaust. In the Second World War, he served with the Jewish Brigade of the British Army in North Africa and Europe. While on leave in Paris, a French girlfriend gave him a camera as a gift, and he discovered he enjoyed photography. He took his first professional photo of Jewish youths climbing a British tank to celebrate the United Nations Partition Plan for Palestine, creating the Israeli state.

After the war, he visited his father in England and learned that he had other relatives in Germany. There, he met his cousin Anni and her mother, who had survived the Holocaust. He offered to marry her to secure her emigration to Palestine, but the marriage of convenience ended up lasting more than 50 years until her death. The couple had two children together. He described his marriage as "tempestuous" and stated in his autobiography Israel Through My Lens that he had numerous affairs over the years. However, he faithfully cared for her in the last years of her life when she was stricken with cancer.

After Anni's death, Rubinger at age 78 met Ziona Spivak, a Yemenite immigrant, with whom he had a relationship for two and a half years, although they never married. Spivak was murdered in her home in 2004 by her former gardener, Mohammad Mahmoud Sabarna, a Palestinian from the West Bank, who entered the home and demanded that she give him 25,000 shekels, then grabbing a knife and stabbing her to death when she refused.

Rubinger died on 2 March 2017 at the age of 92.

Photography career
Upon his return to Mandatory Palestine in 1946, Rubinger opened a photography business in Jerusalem, but broke into photojournalism when Uri Avnery offered him a position at HaOlam HaZeh in 1951, where he worked for two years. He then joined the staff of Yedioth Ahronoth, followed by The Jerusalem Post. His break came in 1954 when he was asked to shoot a story for Time–Life. He ended up working for them for more than 50 years. His first internationally published photo for them was of a nun holding a set of dentures that had belonged to a patient who had dropped them from a Catholic hospital window over the Green Line and into Jordanian territory. The nun was allowed to cross the border only after much negotiation.
As Time–Life's primary photographer for the region, Rubinger covered all of Israel's wars and was given unprecedented access to governmental leaders: he was the only photographer allowed in the Knesset cafeteria. With the sort of access and exposure that allows the subjects to disregard the photographer's presence, Rubinger was able to take memorable photos of Golda Meir feeding her granddaughter or quiet moments between Yitzhak and Leah Rabin, for example.

Rubinger's signature photograph is of paratroopers at the Western Wall, shortly after its recapture by Israeli forces in the Six-Day War. Shot from a low angle, the faces of (left to right) Zion Karasenti, Yitzhak Yifat, and Haim Oshri are framed against the wall. The three of them are framed with their backs toward the wall, gazing off into the distance, and Yifat (centre) holds his helmet in his hand. Israeli author Yossi Klein Halevi calls it "the most beloved Jewish photographic image of our time".

Prior to taking the photograph, Rubinger had been at el-Arish on the Sinai Peninsula when he heard a rumour that something big was going to happen in Jerusalem. He hopped aboard a helicopter ferrying wounded soldiers to Beersheba, although he didn't know its destination at the time. His car happened to be there, and he drove the rest of the way, at one point asking a hitchhiking soldier he had picked up to drive because he was too sleepy. He arrived in the Old City and after visiting quickly with his family, made his way to the wall. The space between the wall and the buildings in front of it was very narrow, so he lay down to get a shot of the wall itself, when the paratroopers walked by and he took several shots of them.

Twenty minutes later, IDF Chief Rabbi Shlomo Goren arrived on scene with a shofar and a Torah scroll, whereupon Goren was hoisted upon the shoulders of the soldiers. It was an emotional scene and Rubinger by far preferred his photograph of that, though his wife Anni told him "the one of the three soldiers" was better.

As part of his agreement with the Israeli Army allowing him front-line access, he turned the negatives over to the government, who distributed it to everyone for a mere IL2 each. It was then widely pirated as well. Although Rubinger was upset about his work being stolen, the photo's widespread distribution made it famous.

The image engenders such a strong emotional component that it has become an icon of Israel. Israeli Supreme Court Justice Misha'el Kheshin declared in 2001 that the photo had "become the property of the entire nation".

Awards and recognition
David Rubinger was awarded the Israel Prize in communications for 1997, the first year it was awarded in that category. (His fellow laureate in communications was veteran television broadcaster Haim Yavin). He was the first photographer to receive the Israel Prize, as the category of Photography was not awarded until 2000.

On 5 March 2017, Israel's mass-circulation Hebrew-language daily Yedioth Ahronoth, for whom Rubinger had worked in the past, published a 21-page special photographic supplement in colour of selected photographs spanning his career. Titled "The Man Who Was There," the cover caption read: "There's no Israeli leader he didn't document or historic event where he wasn't present. To a great extent, David Rubinger, who passed away last week, is the photographer of our life here in Israel."

See also
Visual arts in Israel
 List of Israel Prize recipients
 Ze'ev Aleksandrowicz (1905–1992)
 Zoltan Kluger (1896–1977)
 Samuel Joseph Schweig 
 :de:Herbert Sonnenfeld (1906–1972)
 Rudi Weissenstein (1910–1999)

References

External links

 My Eye on Israel, by David Rubinger
Time obituary
Haaretz obituary
Jerusalem Post obituary
Guardian obituary
Reuters obituary
Forward obituary
Forward second obituary
Times of Israel obituary
President of Israel eulogy

1924 births
2017 deaths
20th-century Israeli male artists
Israeli photographers
Time (magazine) people
Israel Prize in communication recipients
Jewish emigrants from Austria to Mandatory Palestine after the Anschluss
Israeli people of Austrian-Jewish descent
British Army personnel of World War II
Mandatory Palestine military personnel of World War II
Jewish Brigade personnel